National Highway 340 (NH 340) is a National Highway in the Indian state of Andhra Pradesh & Karnataka. It was formed as a new highway by up-grading former state highway of the state. It starts at Kadapa and Bangalore .

Route 

It starts at Kadapa and passes through Chinnamandem, Gurramkonda Madanapalli  Bengalore  in Karnataka. It has a route length of

See also 
 List of National Highways in Andhra Pradesh

References 

340
340
National highways in India